Forthside Bridge (often referred to as Spiky Bridge) is a large pedestrian bridge located in the city of Stirling, in the Central Belt of Scotland. Opened on 2 May 2009, the bridge crosses Stirling railway station, a busy interchange station located on the former Caledonian Main Line and connects the city centre with the Forthside Development, a £90 million residential and leisure area on the banks of the River Forth.

A form of Inverted Fink truss bridge, similar to the Royal Victoria Dock Bridge in London, the construction costs of the Forthside Bridge were estimated at around £6.5 Million. Since its completion, the bridge has become a local landmark and has been praised for its design, receiving a commendation from the Institution of Structural Engineers in 2010.

History and Design
The bridge was constructed as part of the 40-acre Forthside Development plan, an urban regeneration project from Stirling Council, located around the former Forthside Barracks. Construction of the £6.5 million bridge was carried out by Edmund Nuttall Group alongside architects Gifford and WilkinsonEyre (famous for designing the Gateshead Millennium Bridge). Funding for the project was given by the Scottish Government, alongside the European Regional Development Fund. Due to the bridge's complex design, opening plans faced numerous delays and was originally scheduled to open in November 2008. 

The bridge is around 113m long, stands around 6m from the ground and is a unique form of inverted Fink truss with its longest span of 88.2m, over numerous mainline rail tracks of Stirling Station. Glass parapets are fitted along the path over the bridge, which are illuminated at night. For ease of access, the bridge has lifts at either end.

Opening
The bridge opened to the general public on 2 May 2009 and, as a publicity stunt, Stirling Council recruited 6 members of the public named William Wallace (after Sir William Wallace who defeated the English army at the Battle of Stirling Bridge in 1297) to open the bridge.

Vandalism
Since opening, the bridge has suffered numerous acts of vandalism such as graffiti, anti-social behaviour and damage to bridge facilities. During the bridge's initial years, the access lifts were closed for almost three years after persistent damage. The Stirling Observer (Daily Record) received information that "following damage to the lift and glass panels CCTV cameras costing £1031 were installed."

References

Pedestrian bridges in Scotland
Buildings and structures in Stirling (city)
Bridges completed in 2009
Cable-stayed bridges in Scotland
2009 establishments in Scotland